Michael Anthony Mangini (born April 18, 1963) is an American musician and current drummer of the progressive metal band Dream Theater. He has also played for bands and artists such as Annihilator, Extreme, James LaBrie, and Steve Vai. Before joining Dream Theater, Mangini was a faculty member at Berklee College of Music. Between 2002 and 2005, he set five World's Fastest Drummer records. Mangini appeared on the Discovery Channel show Time Warp, displaying his drum skills for high-speed cameras.

Early life and career 
Born in Newton, Massachusetts, to Italian parents, Mangini first started playing the drums when he was two and a half years old, being inspired by Ringo Starr of The Beatles. He would practice two to four hours a day and by the time he was nine he was already mimicking Buddy Rich performances. Other influences include Bobby Colomby, Danny Seraphine, John Bonham, Neil Peart and Terry Bozzio.

By high school, he was performing in bands and participating in the prestigious All-State, and All-Eastern United States ensembles.

After graduating from Waltham Senior High School in 1981, Mangini put aside his music studies to pursue a computer science major at Bentley University. After graduating he started programming software for the Patriot Missile program. At the same time, he was working on a program that studied the links between the human brain and body.

In 1987, Mangini scored one of his first high-profile gigs, playing drums for Boston's Rick Berlin Band. This would be his first collaboration with bassist Philip Bynoe. He also taught drums privately in Boston during this time.

In 1991, Mangini joined the thrash metal band Annihilator, playing drums on several tracks for the band's album Set the World on Fire. He went on to tour with the band in support of this album until 1994. That year, he joined Boston hard rock band Extreme, replacing original drummer Paul Geary. Mangini played on three songs on Extreme's 1995 album Waiting for the Punchline, and appeared with the band on the Late Show with David Letterman.

After Extreme disbanded in 1996, Mike was informed through drummer Jonathan Mover that guitarist Steve Vai was auditioning drummers for his live band. Mike successfully auditioned for Vai's band and relocated to Los Angeles. From late 1996 to early 2000, Mangini was the highly regarded drummer of Vai's live ensemble, which also included bassist Philip Bynoe, guitarist Mike Keneally and beginning in 2000, guitarist Dave Weiner. Mangini appeared on Vai's studio albums Fire Garden and The Ultra Zone, and the live album Alive in an Ultra World.

During a hiatus on Vai's Ultra Zone tour in 2000, Mangini returned to Boston, where he served as an associate professor at Berklee College of Music. He also formed the short-lived band Tribe of Judah with former Extreme frontman Gary Cherone and bassist Pat Badger. Mangini appeared on other albums during this time, including a Rush tribute record entitled Subdivisions and his second and third Annihilator albums titled All for You and Metal, respectively.  He also recorded tracks for artists Sal DiFusco, Bill Lonero and Chris Emerson.

In 2005, Mangini accepted a full-time teaching position at the Berklee College of Music in the Percussion Department. He resigned in 2010 after joining Dream Theater.

Dream Theater 

In late 2010, Mangini, along with Marco Minnemann, Peter Wildoer (who also served as a drummer for LaBrie's solo project at the time), Virgil Donati, Aquiles Priester, Derek Roddy and Thomas Lang, auditioned to succeed Mike Portnoy as the drummer for Dream Theater. He had previously appeared on three solo albums by Dream Theater's lead singer, James LaBrie. Mangini was announced as Dream Theater's new drummer on April 29, 2011, several months after he actually joined. He has appeared on every Dream Theater release since 2011's A Dramatic Turn Of Events. Distance over Time, Mangini's fourth studio album with Dream Theater, featured his debut as a lyricist, on the song "Room 137".

Other projects 

Mangini served as the drummer for Dream Theater bandmate John Petrucci on the G3 tour, along with bassist Dave LaRue, in 2012 and 2018.

In 2015, Mangini joined U.K. for their "Final World Tour".

Gear 
Mike plays and endorses Pearl drums, hardware, pedals and percussion, Zildjian cymbals, Vater drumsticks, Remo drumheads and Shure microphones.

Discography

Selected album appearances 

Annihilator
 Set the World on Fire (1993)
 All for You (2004)
 Metal (2007)

Extreme
 Waiting for the Punchline (1995) – tracks "Hip Today", "Leave Me Alone" and "No Respect"

Nuno Bettencourt
 Schizophonic (1997) – tracks "Swollen Princess" and "Fine By Me"

Mike Keneally
 Sluggo! (1997) – track "Egg Zooming"

Steve Vai
 Fire Garden (1996) – tracks "Bangkok" and "The Fire Garden Suite"
 G3: Live in Concert (1996)
 Merry Axemas – A Guitar Christmas (1997) – track "Christmas Time is Here"
 The Ultra Zone (1999) – tracks "Jibboom", "Windows to the Soul" and "Here I Am"
 Alive in an Ultra World (2001)
The Story of Light (2012) – track "The Moon and I"
Modern Primitive (2016) – track "Never Forever"

MullMuzzler/James LaBrie
 Keep It to Yourself (1999)
 James LaBrie's MullMuzzler 2 (2001)
 Elements of Persuasion (2005)

Sal DiFusco
 Nevertheless (2000)
 Great Exploits (2002)
 Vanishing Mist (2008)

Tribe of Judah
 Exit Elvis (2002)

Mike Visconti
 Take 3 (1999)
 In Other Words (2003)
   Boston Accent (2007)

Tim Donahue
 Madmen & Sinners (2004)

Rush Tribute
 Subdivisions (2005)

Shredding the Envelope
 The Call of the Flames (2009)

Daniel Pique
 Boo!! (2009)

Dream Theater
 A Dramatic Turn of Events (2011)
 Dream Theater (2013)
 Live at Luna Park (2013)
 Breaking the Fourth Wall (2014)
 The Astonishing (2016)
 Distance Over Time (2019)
 Distant Memories – Live in London (2020)
 A View from the Top of the World (2021)

Into the Great Divide
 Into the Great Divide (2018)

Rob Silverman
 Drumology II (2022) – track "Victory"

Cross Country Driver
 The New Truth (2023) – tracks "Wild Child", "Rio Tularosa" and "Shine"

References

External links 

Official Rhythm Knowledge website
Pearl Drums: Drumset Artists – Mike Mangini: Dream Theater

1963 births
Living people
American heavy metal drummers
Dream Theater members
Extreme (band) members
Missing Persons (band) members
Berklee College of Music faculty
Bentley University alumni
20th-century American drummers
American male drummers
Annihilator (band) members
American people of Italian descent
Waltham High School alumni